Lucas Martínez Quarta (born 10 May 1996) is an Argentine professional footballer who plays as a centre back for Serie A club Fiorentina and the Argentina national team.

Club career
A product of River Plate's youth academy, Martínez Quarta made his professional debut for the club in November 2016. He was a member of the 2018 Copa Libertadores winning side, starting in the first leg of the final against Boca Juniors.

On 5 October 2020, Martínez Quarta signed a five-year contract with Serie A club Fiorentina.

International career
Martínez Quarta made his debut for the Argentina national team on 5 September 2019, in a friendly 0–0 draw against Chile, playing the full 90 minutes.

Career statistics

Club

International

Honours
River Plate
Copa Argentina: 2017, 2019
Supercopa Argentina: 2018
Copa Libertadores: 2018
Recopa Sudamericana: 2019

Argentina
Copa América: 2021
Individual
 Copa Libertadores Team of the Tournament: 2019

References

External links

 Profile at the ACF Fiorentina website 
 

1996 births
Living people
Footballers from Buenos Aires
Argentine footballers
Association football defenders
Argentina international footballers
2021 Copa América players
Copa América-winning players
Copa Libertadores-winning players
Club Atlético River Plate footballers
ACF Fiorentina players
Argentine Primera División players
Serie A players
Argentine expatriate footballers
Argentine expatriate sportspeople in Italy
Expatriate footballers in Italy